dBv, dBV, or DBV may refer to:

 DBV is the Afrikaans abbreviation of the word "Dierebeskermingsvereniging", the English definition of DBV is SPCA and trademarked in South Africa to the National Council of Societies for the Prevention of Cruelty to Animals - South Africa.
 dBV, a measurement of voltage
 Deutscher Baseball und Softball Verband eV (DBV), the Baseball Bundesliga, the elite competition for the sport of baseball in Germany. 
 Deutscher Bauernverband, the advocacy group for farmers in Germany
 DBV, the IATA airport code for Dubrovnik Airport
 DBV, a type of pulsating white dwarf
 Dollis Brook Viaduct
 Dictionary of Virginia Biography, frequently abbreviated as the DBV
 DBV Technologies, a French bio-pharmaceutical company
 German Construction Workers' Union